Don Coleman may refer to:
 Don Coleman (actor) (1893–1985), American film actor
 Don Coleman (offensive tackle) (1928–2017), American football player
 Don Coleman (linebacker) (born 1952), American football player and entrepreneur
 Don Coleman (musician), Canadian rock singer
 Don Coleman (coach) (1933–2020), Texas high school basketball coach

See also
 Donald Coleman (1925–1991), British politician
 Donald Coleman (cricketer) (1927–1983), New Zealand cricketer